The Fresno Tigers (also occasionally known as the Packers and Raisin Growers) were a minor league baseball team which played in the California League and California State League from 1908 to 1914, while representing the city of Fresno, California.

External links
Baseball Reference

Baseball teams established in 1908
Baseball teams disestablished in 1914
Defunct California League teams
Defunct California State League teams
Baseball in Fresno, California
Professional baseball teams in California
Defunct baseball teams in California
1908 establishments in California
1914 disestablishments in California